Golina   is a town in Konin County, Greater Poland Voivodeship, in central Poland, with 4,366 inhabitants (2004).

History
The town was mentioned in the Gesta principum Polonorum, the oldest Polish chronicle from the early 12th century. It was granted town rights in the 14th century. It was a private town, administratively located in the Konin County in the Kalisz Voivodeship in the Greater Poland Province of the Kingdom of Poland. In 1793 Golina was annexed by Prussia as a result of the Second Partition of Poland. Regained by Poles in 1807, as part of the short-lived Polish Duchy of Warsaw, in 1815 it became part of Congress Poland, later forcibly integrated with Imperial Russia. During the January Uprising, on March 16, 1863, a skirmish between Polish insurgents and Russian soldiers took place there. The Polish insurgent unit was attacked by Russian troops and forced to escape towards Lądek. As part of anti-Polish repressions after the fall of the uprising, Golina was deprived of its town rights in 1870, which it regained in 1921, after Poland regained independence. During the occupation of Poland (World War II) the Germans expelled most of its populace to the General Government in the more eastern part of German-occupied Poland.

References

Cities and towns in Greater Poland Voivodeship
Konin County